Barclay Field  (1 April 1835 — 7 November 1892) was an English first-class cricketer and businessman.

The son of George Field, he was born at Clapham in April 1835. He was educated at Eton College, before going up to University College, Oxford. Field played first-class cricket for the Marylebone Cricket Club (MCC) against Cambridge University at Fenner's in 1861. Batting twice in the match, he was unbeaten without scoring in the MCC first innings, while in their second innings he was dismissed for 17 runs by Herbert Salter. By profession he was in business in London and was a justice of the peace for Kent. Field died following a stroke and subsequent short illness in November 1892, at his lodge in Otford, Kent. His brother, George, was also a first-class cricketer.

References

External links

1835 births
1892 deaths
People from Clapham
People educated at Eton College
Alumni of University College, Oxford
English cricketers
Marylebone Cricket Club cricketers
English businesspeople
English justices of the peace